Jonathan Martin (born c. 1977) is an American political journalist. He is a national political correspondent for The New York Times, the co-author of the 2012 book The End of the Line: Romney vs. Obama: The 34 Days That Decided the Election, and the co-author of the 2022 book This Will Not Pass: Trump, Biden, and the Battle for America's Future.

Early life
Jonathan Martin was born around 1977 in Arlington, Virginia. He majored in history at Hampden–Sydney College, where he graduated with a bachelor of arts degree.

Career
Martin worked as a political reporter for National Journal "The Hotline," the National Review and Politico. In 2013, he joined The New York Times, as a national political correspondent.

With Glenn Thrush, Martin co-authored a book about the 2012 United States presidential election. In a review for Chicago magazine, Carol Felsenthal noted that it was "full of insider intelligence."

Together with fellow New York Times reporter Alexander Burns, Martin authored the book This Will Not Pass: Trump, Biden, and the Battle for America’s Future on the last months of Donald Trump's presidency, the COVID-19 pandemic, and the January 6, 2021 attack on the US Capitol building, which was published in May 2022.

Personal life
Martin married Elizabeth Fischer in 2012.

Works

Jonathan Martin & Alexander Burns, This Will Not Pass: Trump, Biden, and the Battle for America's Future. Simon & Schuster, 2022

References

External links
 
 

1977 births
Living people
People from Arlington County, Virginia
Hampden–Sydney College alumni
The New York Times writers
American political journalists
Politico people